Étienne Sansonetti (5 December 1935 – 31 May 2018) was a French professional footballer who played as a striker. Sansonetti played his club football with Marseille, Valenciennes, Angers, Bastia, AC Ajaccio, Monaco and Gazélec Ajaccio. Sansonetti was the Ligue 1 topscorer in the 1967-68 season, scoring 26 goals.

References

 Profile
 Corsica national football team

1935 births
2018 deaths
Footballers from Marseille
French footballers
Ligue 1 players
Ligue 2 players
Valenciennes FC players
SC Bastia players
Angers SCO players
Olympique de Marseille players
AC Ajaccio players
AS Monaco FC players
Corsica international footballers
Association football forwards
French people of Corsican descent